The following is a list of unproduced Spike Lee projects in roughly chronological order. During his long career, American film director and producer Spike Lee has worked on a number of projects which never progressed beyond the pre-production stage under his direction. Some of these projects, fell in development hell or are officially canceled.

1990s

Early development of 42

2000s

Early development of Get On Up

Save Me, Joe Louis 
In July 2000, Lee acquired the rights to make a film about Joe Louis from a script he wrote with boxing expert Bert Randolph Sugar and scriptwriting legend Budd Schulberg under the title "Save Me, Joe Louis". The movie was focused on Louis’ fights with Max Schmeling with Arnold Schwarzenegger interested in playing Schmeling. In July 2006, Schulberg mentioned that Lee talked with Terrence Howard to play Louis. The film fell into development hell because Lee didn't get half of the budget he needed.

Inside Man 2

Selling Time film
In May 2006, Lee was set to direct 20th Century Fox’s supernatural thriller Selling Time, with Tom Cruise in talks to star. In January 2014, D.J. Caruso took over directing the movie from Lee, with Dan McDermott writing a new draft and Will Smith is rumored to star in the movie. However, plans fell in development hell and its fate is unknown after the Acquisition of 21st Century Fox by Disney was completed.

Time Traveler
In June 2008, it was announced that Lee was going to adapt Ronald Mallett's memoir Time Traveler: A Scientist’s Personal Mission to Make Time Travel a Reality into a feature film.  The film was to have been titled Time Traveler and Lee was to have co-written and directed it.  On July 27, 2015, Mallett reported that Lee and screenwriter Ian Harnarine were "in negotiations about how to proceed regarding a feature film of my book, Time Traveler."

L.A. Riots film
In July 2008, Lee was set to direct a L.A. Riots film, with John Ridley and Terry George writing the script and Brian Grazer producing the film. In August 2012, Justin Lin was set to direct the L.A. Riots film, since Lee didn't get enough money and ended up working on Miracle at St. Anna. There has been no further announcements since.

Now the Hell Will Start film 
In February 2009, Lee acquired the rights to Brendan Koerner's novel Now the Hell Will Start, a World War II manhunt in the Burmese jungle. However, plans fell into development hell.

2010s

Brooklyn Loves Michael Jackson
On 21 April 2010, Samuel L. Jackson announced that Lee showed him a script that he wrote titled Brooklyn Loves Michael Jackson.  The script, according to Samuel L. Jackson, was "about these folks who want to have a big concert in a Brooklyn park for Michael.  And the new gentrified people that live in the neighborhood are worried about the kind of element that might be coming into the neighborhood."  On 24 January 2011, it was announced that Lee scrapped the project.

Da Brick  pilot 
On 21 June 2011, HBO announced they would develop a pilot for the series Da Brick, with Lee directing the pilot, written by John Ridley and executive-produced by Lee, Ridley, Mike Tyson, and Doug Ellin, based on Tyson's childhood, and John Boyega was cast as the lead, Donnie.  In March 2012, HBO passed on the pilot.

Nagasaki Deadline film
On 28 June 2010, Lee was announced to direct the thriller Nagasaki Deadline with David Griffiths, Peter Griffiths, William Broyles Jr. writing the script and Lightstorm Entertainment producing the film. However, plans fell into development hell.

Untitled Marion Barry biopic
On 9 December 2011, Lee was set to direct and produce a biopic of Marion Barry with Eddie Murphy set to play Barry, and John Ridley writing the script for HBO Films. There has been no further announcements since.

Porgy & Bess remake
On 9 August 2012, Lee was in negotiations with the George Gershwin estate to direct the Porgy and Bess remake. On 5 April 2013, Both the Gershwin Family and the DuBose Heyward estate announced a remake is in development without Lee's involvement. On February 11, 2020, Dee Rees was hired to write and direct the remake.

Spinning Gold biopic

On 30 October 2013, Lee was in negotiations to direct the biopic of Neil Bogart with Justin Timberlake set to play Bogart with Bogart's son Tim writing the script entitled Spinning Gold. On 19 June 2019, Tim was announced as director and Jeremy Jordan replaced Timberlake.

Enter the Dragon remake
On 26 September 2014, Lee was in negotiations to direct the remake of Enter the Dragon with Ken Jeong set to play Lee and Billy Bob Thornton set to play Roper. On March 21, 2015, Brett Ratner revealed that he replaced Lee as director, and on July 23, 2018, David Leitch is in early talks to direct the remake instead of Ratner.

Nightwatch
By September 2017, Sony Pictures was actively developing a film based on the character Nightwatch for their Sony Pictures Universe of Marvel Characters, with a script from Edward Ricourt. Sony wanted Lee to direct the film, and he was confirmed to be interested in the project in March 2018, with Cheo Hodari Coker re-writing the script. However, Lee was no longer involved by October.

References 

Films directed by Spike Lee
Lee, Spike